Hitesh Walunj (born 3 April 1993) is an Indian cricketer. He made his Twenty20 debut for Maharashtra in the 2018–19 Syed Mushtaq Ali Trophy on 2 March 2019.

References

External links
 

1993 births
Living people
Indian cricketers
Maharashtra cricketers
Place of birth missing (living people)